Amarpatti is a village and Village Development Committee  in Bara District in the Narayani Zone of south-eastern Nepal. At the time of the 2011 Nepal census it had a population of 3,738 people living in 508 individual households. There were 1,874 males and 1,864 females at the time of census.

Ward No. 8 
Ward Office: - Amarpati

Includes Vdc: - Amarpati (Ward 1 - 9)

Total Area: - 6.48 (Square K.M.)

Total Population: - 3738 (2011)

Ward Contact Person Name, Post, and Contact

References

External links
UN map of the municipalities of Bara District

Populated places in Bara District